Ronald Elmer "Chief" Delorme (born September 3, 1955) is a Canadian former professional ice hockey player and the chief amateur scout for the Vancouver Canucks of the National Hockey League (NHL). Delorme played in the NHL for the Colorado Rockies and the Vancouver Canucks, and in the WHA for the Denver Spurs/Ottawa Civics.

Delorme was born in North Battleford, but grew up in Cochin, Saskatchewan. Though Delorme retired from the NHL in 1985, he has remained on the Vancouver Canucks staff for over 20 years as a scout and was appointed chief amateur scout in 2000.

Delorme is a Canadian Métis. As a Cree man, he was instrumental in breaking barriers for Indigenous people in professional sport, and continues to inspire Indigenous youth to participate in sport by visiting reserves and sharing his story.

Career statistics

Regular season and playoffs

References

External links

1955 births
Baltimore Clippers (SHL) players
Canadian Métis people
Colorado Rockies (NHL) players
Denver Spurs draft picks
Denver Spurs (WHA) players
Ice hockey people from Saskatchewan
Kansas City Scouts draft picks
Lethbridge Broncos players
Living people
Métis sportspeople
Ottawa Civics players
Prince Albert Raiders (SJHL) players
Sportspeople from North Battleford
Swift Current Broncos players
Vancouver Canucks players
Vancouver Canucks scouts
Canadian ice hockey right wingers